CAPLE (Centro de Avaliação de Português Língua Estrangeira or Centre for Evaluation of Portuguese as a Foreign Language) is a certificate of proficiency in Standard European Portuguese as a second language offered in Portugal and 45 other countries and territories. The official CAPLE examinations and certificates/diplomas are developed, delivered, and accredited by a tri-partite collaboration in Portugal between the School of Arts and Humanities at the University of Lisbon and the Instituto Camões, which administers the examination procedures on behalf of the Portuguese Ministry of Foreign Affairs.

Eligibility 

To take the test, applicants must be at least 14 years of age, be a national of a country where Portuguese is not an official language, or, if they are from a country whose official language is Portuguese, they must meet two of the following conditions: 
 Their parents' first language is not Portuguese.
 Their first language acquired was not Portuguese.
 Their main language of communication is not Portuguese.
 All or part of their basic or secondary education was not in Portuguese.

Levels 

CAPLE exams take place in May, July, and November in all testing centres, in addition to February, March, August, September, and October in Lisbon only. CAPLE exams are offered at six levels; however, there are a few places that may not offer the ACESSO level.

Test Format

There are four parts of evaluation in every level that tests all four major language abilities - reading, writing, listening, and speaking. There is also an additional part called "Competência Estrutural" that appears on only the DIPLE, DAPLE, and DUPLE tests. The weight and amount of time allocated for each section varies by level.

Scoring

The minimum passing mark to receive the certificate or diploma for any test is 55%. Four categories of results dictate how well a candidate does.

Recognition

CAPLE certificates/diplomas do not expire over time and are recognized across Portugal by various national and international institutions for the benefit of foreigners looking to:
 study and gain admission to Portuguese universities
 find work and pursue a professional or academic career in Portugal
 obtain Portuguese nationality or permanent residency status (the A2/CIPLE level can be used to satisfy the requirement of having "basic Portuguese" skills)

See also

CELPE-Bras - Exam of Brazilian Portuguese for Foreigners developed by the Brazilian Ministry of Education

TELC - The European Language Certificates (Portuguese available at Level B1 only)

External links
 CAPLE Official Website (Portuguese only)
 CAPLE - Portuguese Language Proficiency Test

References

Portuguese language tests